Església de Sant Bartomeu de Soldeu  is a church located in Soldeu, Canillo Parish, Andorra. It is a heritage property registered in the Cultural Heritage of Andorra. It was built in the 17th or 18th century.

References

Canillo
Roman Catholic churches in Andorra
Cultural Heritage of Andorra